Hubert Luthe (22 May 1927 – 4 February 2014) was a German Roman Catholic bishop.

Ordained to the priesthood in 1951, Luthe was appointed titular bishop of Egabro and auxiliary bishop of the Roman Catholic Archdiocese of Cologne, Germany. In 1991, he appointed bishop of the Roman Catholic Diocese of Essen and retired in 2002.

Notes

Roman Catholic bishops of Essen
21st-century German Roman Catholic bishops
1927 births
2014 deaths
20th-century German Roman Catholic bishops
20th-century German Roman Catholic priests
21st-century Roman Catholic bishops in Germany